WKJV is a listener supported Christian radio station licensed in Asheville, North Carolina.  It broadcasts at the frequency of 1380 AM and serves Buncombe, Madison, McDowell, Mitchell, Haywood, Henderson, Yancey, and Transylvania Counties.  WKJV is a ministry of International Baptist Outreach Missions, Inc., a not-for-profit organization.  The station's programming features Southern gospel music and preaching from the King James Bible. WKJV has a daytime non-directional power of 25,000 watts and a night-time directional power of 1000 watts.

History
WLOS began broadcasting August 11, 1947, as a Mutual affiliate on 1380 kHz with power of 5 kW (daytime) and 1 kW (night). The station was licensed to Skyway Broadcasting Corporation.

In 1969, WLOS was sold to Greater Asheville Broadcasting Co., owned by the John Jenkins family of Huntington, West Virginia. As the previous owners retained WLOS-FM and WLOS-TV, the call letters were changed to WKKE; the format was MOR/Top 40.

In 1977, WKKE became WRAQ and played adult rock. In 1982, Sid Highes became program director and the format changed to Southern Gospel.

In 1988, GHB Broadcasting purchased the station and changed its letters to WTOO. In 1992, WTOO was not profitable and a format change to rock and roll was planned. Hearing this news, Pastor Doug Roland of Maple Ridge Baptist Church in Candler told some area pastors about the problem, and the decision was made to buy the station by asking listeners to contribute. In five days, $53,000 was raised. Anchor Baptist Broadcasting, which also runs WGCR, took over the station and the call letters WKJV were selected, referring to the King James Version of the Bible.

International Baptist Outreach Missions took over in 1997. In September 2001 the signal increased to 25,000 watts. WKJV can now be heard in parts of South Carolina and Tennessee. On July 17, 2013, the former WFGW, after being purchased by I.B.O.M., became WKJW.

References

External links
 WKJV official website

FCC History Cards for WKJV

KJV
Wometco Enterprises
KJV
Radio stations established in 1947
1947 establishments in North Carolina
Southern Gospel radio stations in the United States